Saint Anthony is an unincorporated community in Jackson Township, Dubois County, in the U.S. state of Indiana.

History
St. Anthony, originally known as St. Joseph, was platted in 1860. Its name was changed to its current form in order to secure a post office. The Saint Anthony post office was established in 1874.

Geography
Saint Anthony is part of the Jasper Micropolitan Statistical Area.

References

Unincorporated communities in Dubois County, Indiana
Unincorporated communities in Indiana
Jasper, Indiana micropolitan area
1860 establishments in Indiana
Populated places established in 1860